Duun may refer to:

People
 Aksel Duun (1921–1987), a Danish sprint canoer
 Olav Duun (1876–1939), a Norwegian author

Other
 Duun language, a Mande language of Mali